Chao Shao-an or Zhao Shao'ang (1905, Guangdong – 1998) was a Chinese artist of the Lingnan School of painting.

Galleries that feature his work
 Hong Kong Heritage Museum
Guangzhou Museum of Art
 Asian Art Museum of San Francisco

External links
 Biography from the Lingnan School of Painting

1905 births
1998 deaths
People from Panyu District
Artists from Guangzhou
20th-century Chinese painters